William Charles Athersmith Harper (10 May 1872 – 18 September 1910), known as Charlie Athersmith, was an English professional footballer who played as a winger. He played the majority of his club career at Aston Villa, making 307 appearances and scoring 85 goals, and also made 106 appearances for Small Heath. He was capped 12 times for England.

Personal life

Athersmith was born William Charles Athersmith Harper in Bloxwich, Staffordshire, to Isaac Harper and Mary Jane Wootton. Before becoming a professional footballer he was a clerk in Birmingham where he married Elizabeth Baggott in 1893. He is a first cousin of Rotherham United and Liverpool player Vic Wright. He died in Shifnal, Shropshire at the age of 38. His death was drink related.

Playing career

Aston Villa
Athersmith played a key role in Villa's title-winning sides of 1894, 1896, 1897, 1899 and 1900 as well as reaching three FA Cup finals, finishing on the losing side in 1892 before gaining winners' medals in 1895 and the Double-winning final of the 1896–97 season. He was also a member of the team that were victims of a giant-killing in the 1899–1900 FA Cup at the hands of Millwall Athletic.

A league match in November 1894 against Sheffield United at Perry Barr was played in driving freezing rain. Villa's players had dry clothes available, and were given hot drinks, a courtesy apparently not extended to the visitors. The Sheffield players were worse affected, severalincluding goalkeeper Willie Foulkeneeding treatment for exposure, and by the end of the match only six were still on the field. Villa's Jack Devey put on an overcoat, and Athersmith played under an umbrella borrowed from a spectator before collapsing in the dressing-room afterwards. Claims that Athersmith scored a goal from beneath the umbrella appear to be apocryphal.

Small Heath
In 1901 he joined Small Heath, where he made 106 appearances and scored 13 goals.

Representative football
Athersmith represented England at outside right on 12 occasions and scored three goals, each of which came against Ireland. He also scored four goals from 9 appearancess for the Football League XI.

References

External links

1872 births
1910 deaths
People from Bloxwich
Association football outside forwards
English footballers
England international footballers
Bloxwich Strollers F.C. players
Aston Villa F.C. players
Birmingham City F.C. players
English Football League players
English Football League representative players
FA Cup Final players